John Crowell (September 15, 1801 – March 8, 1883) was a U.S. Representative from Ohio.

Biography
Born in East Haddam, Connecticut, Crowell moved to Ohio in 1806 with his parents, who settled in Rome Township, Ashtabula County, Ohio, where his father, Samuel Crowell, was the first settler.
He attended the district school.
He moved to Warren, Ohio, in 1822 and he attended Warren Academy from 1822 to1825.
He studied law and was admitted to the bar in 1827 and commenced practice in Warren.
He was also part owner and editor of the Western Reserve Chronicle at Warren.
He served as member of the State senate in 1840.

Congress
Crowell was elected as a Whig to the Thirtieth and Thirty-first Congresses (March 4, 1847 – March 3, 1851). In the 1846 election he defeated John Hutchins, abolitionist, and Rufus P. Ranney, Democrat.
He was not a candidate for renomination in 1850.
He moved to Cleveland, Ohio, in 1852 and resumed the practice of law.
He served in the State militia for twenty years, holding the rank of brigadier general and subsequently that of major general.
He became editor of the Western Law Monthly, published in Cleveland, and a member of the faculty of the Homeopathic Medical College.
He served as president of the Ohio State and Union Law College of Cleveland from 1862 to 1876, when he retired.
He died in Cleveland, Ohio, March 8, 1883.
He was interred in Lake View Cemetery.

Crowell was married to Eliza B. Estabrook in 1833, and had four children.

References

Sources

1801 births
1883 deaths
People from East Haddam, Connecticut
People from Ashtabula County, Ohio
Politicians from Warren, Ohio
Ohio state senators
Burials at Lake View Cemetery, Cleveland
American militia generals
Politicians from Cleveland
Whig Party members of the United States House of Representatives from Ohio
19th-century American politicians